Laura Jacqmin is a Los Angeles-based television writer, playwright, and video game writer from Shaker Heights, Ohio. She was the winner of the 2008 Wasserstein Prize, a $25,000 award given to recognize an emerging female playwright.

Biography 
Jacqmin attended Shaker Heights High School in Cleveland, Ohio. After high school, Jacqmin attended Yale, then went on to receive her Master of Fine Arts degree in Playwriting from Ohio University.

Jacqmin is one of the founding members of The Kilroys, based in Los Angeles. The group came to be in 2014 when they released a list of some of the top un-produced or underproduced plays by female, trans and NB playwrights in an effort to increase gender parity in the American theater.

Awards
 2008, Wasserstein Prize

Filmography

Television 
 One Piece (Netflix)
 Get Shorty (EPIX)
 Grace and Frankie (Netflix)
 Lucky 7 (ABC)
 Joe vs. Carole (Peacock)

Film 
 We Broke Up – Screenwriter with Jeff Rosenberg

Video games 
 Minecraft: Story Mode: Telltale Games (2015)

Plays 
 Dental Society Midwinter Meeting (2010, world premiere)
 A Third (2015, world premiere)
 Residence (2015) 
 We're Going To Be Fine (2015, world premiere)
 Look, we are breathing (2015, world premiere)
 Ghost Bike (2014, world premiere)
 Milvotchkee, Visconsin (2013/2014, co-world premiere)
 Before You Ruin It (2014, academic premiere)
 Do-Gooder (2014, world premiere)
 January Joiner (2013, world premiere)
 And When We Awoke There Was Light and Light (2012, world premiere)
 Dead Pile (2012)
 Ski Dubai (2009, world premiere)
 Two Lakes, Two Rivers (2012)
 Pluto Was a Planet (2008)
 Airborne
 10 Virgins
 Happyslap

Workshops and residencies 
 Williamstown Theatre Festival – Fellowship Project, 2015
 Cape Cod Theatre Project, 2015
 SDC Guest Artist residency at Arizona State University, spring 2014
 Faith Broome playwright in residence at University of Oklahoma, fall 2012
 O’Neill National Playwrights Conference, summer 2012
 Old Vic/New Voices US/UK Exchange, summer 2012
 MacDowell Colony Fellowship, 2011
 Royal Court Theatre’s International Residency, 2011
 Cape Cod Theatre Project, 2011
 Theater of the First Amendment’s First Light Festival, 2011
 Lark Theatre’s Playwrights Week, 2010
 Sundance Theatre Lab, 2010
 Icicle Creek Theatre Festival, 2010
 P73’s Yale residency, 2010
 MacDowell Colony Fellowship, 2009
 Writer in residence at the Marcel Breuer House: Rockefeller Brothers Estate, sponsored by Page 73 and the Rockefeller Brothers Fund, 2009
 Residency in Applied Arts at the Center for Age and Community at University of Wisconsin-Milwaukee, 2009

Awards, honors, and grants 
 Finalist, 2015 Heideman Award for Post-Apocalypto
 Longlisted, Theatre503 Playwriting Award for A Third
 Awardee, 2014 NEA Art Works grant for world premiere production of Milvotchkee, Visconsin
 Winner, 2013 Kennedy Center David Mark Cohen Playwriting Award
 Awardee, 2013 NEA Art Works grant for world premiere production of January Joiner
 Finalist, 2013 Laurents/Hatcher Prize
 Shortlisted, 2012 BBC International Radio Playwriting Competition
 Finalist, 2010–13 Heideman Award
 Finalist, 2008 and 2011 Princess Grace Award
 Finalist, 2011 P73 Playwriting Fellowship
 Member of the Goodman Theatre’s 2010–11 Playwrights’ Unit
 Nominee, 2011 Cherry Lane Mentor Project
 Awarded 2009 Union League Club Civic & Arts Foundation’s Emerging Playwright Award
 Winner/finalist for Aurora Theatre Company’s 2007 and 2009 Global Age Project
 Winner of the 2008 Wasserstein Prize, a $25,000 award given by the Dramatists Guild and the Educational Foundation of America to an emerging female playwright (for And when we awoke there was light and light)

Commissions 
 DePaul University School of Theater, 2014
 Victory Gardens Theater/NNPN, 2012
 South Coast Rep, 2011
 Carthage College, 2011
 Goodman Theatre, 2010
 Arden Theatre Company, 2010
 InterAct Theatre, 2010
 Ensemble Studio Theatre/Alfred P. Sloan Foundation Science and Technology Project, 2010
 Foundation for Jewish Culture: New Jewish Theatre Projects Grant, 2008
 Victory Gardens Theater, 2007

References

External links 
 http://www.laurajacqmin.com/
 Adam Szymkowicz's "I Interview Playwrights Part 121: Laura Jacqmin"

Year of birth missing (living people)
Living people
American women dramatists and playwrights
Writers from Chicago
Writers from Cleveland
Yale University alumni
Ohio University alumni
21st-century American dramatists and playwrights
21st-century American women writers
People from Shaker Heights, Ohio
Video game writers
American television writers
American women screenwriters
American women television writers
Screenwriters from Ohio
Screenwriters from Illinois
21st-century American screenwriters
Women in the video game industry